Peter "Pistol Pete" Horeck (June 15, 1923 — August 29, 2009) was a Canadian professional ice hockey player who played in the National Hockey League for the Chicago Black Hawks, Detroit Red Wings, and Boston Bruins between 1944 and 1952.

Early life
Horeck was born and raised in Massey, Ontario, a small town located about 100 km southwest from Sudbury, Ontario. He was one of eight boys in his family. He took up the sport of hockey in the town.

Career

Pre NHL
Horeck left his hometown to play for the Parry Sound Pilots along with Doug Orr, the father of Bobby Orr. After his tenure in Parry Sound, He played one year in the Eastern Hockey League and four years in the American Hockey League.

NHL
Horeck started his National Hockey League career with the Chicago Black Hawks in 1944. In his second season, he recorded a career high 20 goals and 21 assists for 41 points in all 50 games to make him one of the leagues top scorers that year. 

Horeck was traded midway through the 1946–47 season to the Detroit Red Wings where he would spend another three years. He recorded 3 goals and 7 assists for 10 points in 10 games during the 1947–48 playoffs where Detroit would lose to the Toronto Maple Leafs in the final.

Horeck joined the Boston Bruins before the 1950–51 season. With his production starting to decline, He left the NHL after the 1951–52 season.

Post NHL
Horeck moved back up north to the Northern Ontario Hockey Association where he would play for five years for the Sudbury Wolves and the Soo Indians. He would then spend the rest of his career in various minor leagues until his retirement from hockey in 1960.

Later life
After his retirement, Horeck would settle in Northern Ontario for the rest of his life until his death after a long battle with prostate cancer and neuropathy on Saturday, August 29, 2009 in Sudbury, Ontario. He is considered a hero in his hometown of Massey.

Career statistics

Regular season and playoffs

References

External links 
 

1923 births
2009 deaths
Atlantic City Sea Gulls (EHL) players
Boston Bruins players
Canadian ice hockey coaches
Canadian ice hockey forwards
Charlotte Clippers players
Chicago Blackhawks players
Cleveland Barons (1937–1973) players
Detroit Red Wings players
Eastern Hockey League coaches
Ice hockey people from Ontario
Ice hockey player-coaches
Louisville Rebels players
Ontario Hockey Association Senior A League (1890–1979) players
People from Sudbury District
Providence Reds players
Washington Lions players